Beti Kozkor Kirol Elkartea is a Spanish football team based in Lekunberri, in the autonomous community of Navarre. Founded in 1997, it plays in Tercera División – Group 15, holding home matches at Estadio Municipal Manuel Meler.

History
Founded in 1997 as Club Deportivo Lekumberri, the club started playing in the Primera Regional Navarra the following campaign. The club changed to its current name in 2003, and only achieved promotion to the Regional Preferente in 2014.

In 2017, after three seasons in the fifth division, Beti Kozkor achieved promotion to Tercera División for the first time ever. In May 2019, the club reached the play-offs.

Season to season

3 seasons in Tercera División

References

External links
 
Soccerway team profile

Football clubs in Navarre
Association football clubs established in 1997
1997 establishments in Spain